Shahar may refer to:

 Shahar (god), a deity in Ugaritic religion
 Shahar (newspaper)
 Shahar, Israel, a  moshav  in Israel
 Shahar, Saudi Arabia, a village in Asir province
 Shahar River, northwestern Iran

People with the given name

 Shahar Tavoch (born 1999), Israeli actor, voice actor, and TV host.
 Shahar Biran (born 1998), Israeli tennis player
 Shahar Gordon (born 1980), Israeli basketball player
 Shahar Kober, (born 1979), Israeli illustrator
 Shahar Pe'er (born 1987), Israeli tennis player
 Shahar Perkiss (born 1962), Israeli tennis player

See also
 
 Chahar (disambiguation)